Anolis schwartzi, the Saint Kitts Bank bush anole, Schwartz's anole, or Statia Bank bush anole, is a species of lizard in the family Dactyloidae. The species is found in Sint Eustatius, Saint Kitts, and Nevis.

References

Anoles
Reptiles described in 1972